The 1964 BC Lions finished the season in first place in the Western Conference with an 11–2–3 record, the fewest losses in one season in team history. Of the eight retired numbers in team history, four of those players played on the 1964 team. The Lions began the season undefeated in ten games and were 10–1–1 against western opponents. The Lions' defense was, once again, outstanding as they allowed a team record 10.5 points and 245 yards per game. Joe Kapp would lead the CFL is passing with 2816 yards through the air and 194 completions.

The Lions won the Western Finals over Calgary, taking two games to one, sending them to the Grey Cup  Once again, the Lions met the Hamilton Tiger-Cats in the 52nd Grey Cup in a rematch of the previous year's game. After taking a 34–8 lead into the fourth quarter, the Lions cruised to their first championship by a score of 34–24 on the heels of defensive back and backup fullback Bill Munsey's two touchdown performance. Converted defensive back By Bailey, who scored the first touchdown in Lions' history, retired after the game, ending his 11-year CFL career.

The Lions had six CFL All-stars, including quarterback Joe Kapp, offensive tackle Lonnie Dennis, defensive tackle Mike Cacic, defensive end Dick Fouts, middle guard Tom Brown, and Bill Munsey at defensive back.

The Schenley for the CFL's Most Outstanding Lineman went to defensive lineman Tom Brown for a second season in a row.

Preseason

Regular season

Season standings

Season schedule

Playoffs

West Finals

 BC wins the best-of-three series 2–1 and advance to the Grey Cup Championship game.

Grey Cup

Offensive leaders

Awards and records
 CFL's Most Outstanding Lineman Award – Tom Brown (LB)
Jeff Nicklin Memorial Trophy – Tom Brown (LB)

1964 CFL All-Stars
QB – Joe Kapp, CFL All-Star
OT – Lonnie Dennis, CFL All-Star
DT – Mike Cacic, CFL All-Star
DE – Dick Fouts, CFL All-Star
MG – Tom Brown, CFL All-Star
DB – Bill Munsey, CFL All-Star

References

BC Lions seasons
N. J. Taylor Trophy championship seasons
Grey Cup championship seasons
1964 Canadian Football League season by team
1964 in British Columbia